Maurizio Micheli (born 3 February 1947) is an Italian actor, voice actor, comedian, author, playwright and television personality.

Life and career 
Born in Livorno in 1947, at 11 Micheli moved to Bari with his family, then at 20 he moved to Milan where he attended and graduated at the School of Dramatic Art at the Piccolo Teatro. Between late seventies and eighties Micheli obtained a large popularity as a comedian, through a series of successful variety shows, including Fantastico, W le donne, Al Paradise and A tutto gag. Micheli was also very active on stage, while his film activity was less significant. In 1999 he received the honour Officer of the Italian Republic.

In 2002 he published the novel Garibaldi amore mio, by Baldini Castoldi Dalai, from which a comedy for 2003–2004 theatrical season was acted with the production of the Franco Parenti Theater in Milan. At Verdi Theater of Trieste) in 2007 he is La Gaffe in Il Paese dei Campanelli; during 2015 and 2016 he is engaged with Sabrina Ferilli and Pino Quartullo in the comedy Signori ... le paté de la maison, based on Le prénom (Dinner with friends) by Matthieu Delaporte and Alexandre De La Patellière.

Private life 
He divorced from actress Daniela Nobili, with whom he had a son, Guido. Since 1996 he has had a relationship with the actress and showgirl Benedicta Boccoli. It is 1.74 m tall.

Selected filmography 
 Allegro Non Troppo (1976)
 Café Express (1980)
 Mani di fata (1982)
 Heads I Win, Tails You Lose (1982)
 I Am an ESP (1985) 
 Il commissario Lo Gatto (1987)
 Roba da ricchi (1987)
 Rimini Rimini (1987) 
 Rimini Rimini - Un anno dopo (1988) 
 Cucciolo (1998)
 Commediasexi (2006)
 Valzer (2007)
 The Cézanne Affair (2009) 
 Pinocchio (2012)
 Women Drive Me Crazy (2013)
 Quo Vado? (2016)

Teather 
 (1974) Patria e mammà, written and directed
 (1975) Giovinezza addio!, written and directed
 (1975) Magic Modern Macbett, written and directed
 (1978) Mi voleva Strehler, written and directed
 (1979) C'era un sacco di gente soprattutto giovani, of Umberto Simonetta
 (1980) Né bello né dannato, written and directed
 (1981) L'opera dello sghignazzo, of Dario Fo
 (1984) Nudo e senza meta, written and directed
 (1985) Il contrabbasso, of Patrick Süskind, dir. Marco Risi, (presented at Festival dei Due Mondi) 
 (1988) In America lo fanno da anni, written with Umberto Simonetta 
 (1989) Romance Romance, dir. Luigi Squarzina
 (1991) L'ultimo degli amanti focosi, of Neil Simon
 (1992) Disposto a tutto, written with Enrico Vaime
 (1993) Cantando Cantando, written and directed, dor. Gianni Fenzi, with Benedicta Boccoli
 (1994) Buonanotte Bettina, of Garinei e Giovannini, regia di Gianni Fenzi con Benedicta Boccoli, Miranda Martino, Aldo Ralli
 (1996) Un paio d'ali, of Garinei e Giovannini, dir. Pietro Garinei, with Sabrina Ferilli, Maurizio Mattioli, Aurora Banfi
 (1998) Un mandarino per Teo, of Garinei e Giovannini, dir. Gino Landi, with Enzo Garinei Aurora Banfi, Vincenzo Crocitti
 (2000) Polvere di Stelle (adaptation of Maurizio Micheli Polvere di stelle of Alberto Sordi), dir. Marco Mattolini, with Benedicta Boccoli
 (2001) Amphitryon of Plautus, dir. Michele Mirabella, with Benedicta Boccoli, Claudio Angelini, Matteo Micheli
 (2002) Le pillole d'Ercole, of Charles Maurice Hennequin and Paul Bilhaud, dir. Maurizio Nichetti with Benedicta Boccoli, Claudio, Angelini
 (2004) Garibaldi amore mio, written and directed, dir. Michele Mirabella, with Claudio Angelini, Paola Lorenzoni, Anna Casalino
 (2005) La Presidentessa, dir. Gigi Proietti, with Sabrina Ferilli
 (2007) Il contrabbasso, of Patrick Süskind, dir. Marco Risi
 (2007) Il letto ovale, of Ray Cooney and John Chapman, dir. Gino Landi, with Barbara d'Urso and (year later) Maria Laura Baccarini
 (summer 2007) Il Paese dei Campanelli, dir. Maurizio Nichetti
 (summer 2008) Cin Ci La, dir. Maurizio Nichetti
 (2009) Italiani si nasce e noi lo nacquimo, written and directed with Tullio Solenghi, dir. Marcello Cotugno, with Fulvia Lorenzetti, Matteo Micheli
 (2012) George Dandin ou le Mari confondu, of Molère, dir. Alberto Gagnarli, with Benedicta Boccoli, Aldo Ralli, Matteo Micheli
 (2012) L'apparenza inganna, from Francis Veber, written and directed with Tullio Solenghi
 (2012) Anche nelle migliori famiglie, written and acted from Maurizio Micheli, dir Federico Vigorito, with Aldo Ralli, and from 2013 Paolo Gattini
 (2013-2015-2016) Signori... le paté de la maison, from "Le Prenom" of Matthieu DeLaporte and Alexandre De La Patelliere, adapted Carlo Buccirosso and Sabrina Ferilli, dir. Maurizio Micheli. With Sabrina Ferilli, Pino Quartullo, Massimiliano Giovanetti, Claudiafederica Petrella, Liliana Oricchio. 
 (2015) Un coperto in più, of Maurizio Costanzo, dir. Gianfelice Imparato, with Vito, Loredana Giordano, Alessia Fabiani.
 (2016-2017-2018) Uomo solo in fila, monologue written and directed by Maurizio Micheli
 (2017–2018) Il più brutto weekend della nostra vita, of Norm Foster, with Benedicta Boccoli, Nini Salerno, Antonella Elia. Dir. Maurizio Micheli.
 (2019) Tempi nuovi, text and dir. Cristina Comencini, with Iaia Forte
 (2020) Su con la vita text and dir. Maurizio Micheli, with Benedicta Boccoli, Nini Salerno, Nina Pons;

Honours 

  Officier of Order of Merit of the Italian Republic, Rome, 27 December 1999

References

External links 
 

 

Italian male film actors
People from Livorno
1947 births
Italian male stage actors
Living people
Italian male television actors
Italian comedians